John Licina (born 6 August 1976) is a French footballer, who plays for US Valdoie.

Career
Licina started his career with FC Sochaux. He signed for Scottish club Dundee United in September 2000 following a successful trial. After initially appearancing in the first team he lost his place in the side and was placed on the transfer list in May 2001. After a proposed loan move to Arbroath, Licina was once again told he could leave Dundee United in October 2001.

Licina moved to Belfort then spent three years with SR Delémont before leaving at the end of the 2006–07 season. Licina returned in December 2007 and vowed to stay until at least the end of the season.

References

External links

John Licina, Lycée Condorcet

1976 births
Living people
French footballers
French expatriate footballers
FC Sochaux-Montbéliard players
Dundee United F.C. players
SR Delémont players
Scottish Premier League players
Expatriate footballers in Scotland
Expatriate footballers in Switzerland
ASM Belfort players
Association football defenders